Johann Ludwig Dammert (21 March 1788 – 25 January 1855), was First Mayor and President of the Senate (head of state and head of government) of the sovereign city-state of Hamburg in 1843.

Biography 

Dammert was born in Hameln. Son of Johann Christian Dämmert and Susanna Olympia Antoinette Salles.

He held a Doctor of Laws degree.  He was married to Cornelia Wilhelmine Amsinck.  He died, aged 66, in Hamburg.

References

Mayors of Hamburg
Senators of Hamburg (before 1919)
Grand burghers of Hamburg
1788 births
1855 deaths